The 2011 Stephen F. Austin Lumberjacks football team represented Stephen F. Austin State University in the 2011 NCAA Division I FCS football season. The Lumberjacks were led by fifth-year head coach J. C. Harper and played their home games at Homer Bryce Stadium. They are a member of the Southland Conference. They finished the season 6–5, 4–2 in Southland play to finish in third place.

Schedule

 Game was called at the end of the 3rd quarter due to lightning.

References

Stephen F. Austin
Stephen F. Austin Lumberjacks football seasons
Stephen F. Austin Lumberjacks football